The 2019 Esiliiga was the 29th season of the Esiliiga, second tier of Estonian football.

Teams
A total of 10 teams were contesting the league, including 6 sides from the 2018 season, one relegated from 2018 Meistriliiga and three promoted from the 2018 Esiliiga B.

The 2017 Esiliiga and 2018 Esiliiga champions Maardu Linnameeskond got promoted to the highest tier for the first time.

Nõmme Kalju FC U21 was the first team to suffer relegation after just returning to Esiliiga. Keila JK also immediately returned to Esiliiga B after losing the relegation play-offs to Kohtla-Järve JK Järve. JK Tallinna Kalev U21 narrowly avoided getting relegated in their debut season thanks to Tartu FC Santos' decision to start the new season in the fourth tier. The other two teams getting promoted were Tallinna JK Legion, who went almost unbeaten in their previous season, and Tartu JK Tammeka U21, who will be making their debut in Esiliiga.

Stadiums and locations

Personnel and kits

Managerial changes

League table

Relegation play-offs
At season's end the 8th placed club of Esiliiga plays a two-legged play-off with the 3rd placed team of the Esiliiga B.

Results

First half of the season

Second half of the season

Season statistics

Top scorers

Awards

Monthly awards

See also
 2018–19 Estonian Cup
 2019–20 Estonian Cup
 2019 Meistriliiga
 2019 Esiliiga B

References

Esiliiga seasons
2
Estonia
Estonia